The Food Defect Action Levels: Levels of Natural or Unavoidable Defects in Foods That Present No Health Hazards for Humans is a publication of the United States Food and Drug Administration's Center for Food Safety and Applied Nutrition detailing acceptable levels of food contamination from sources such as maggots, thrips, insect fragments, "foreign matter", mold, rodent hairs, and insect and mammalian feces.

The publication details the acceptable amounts of contaminants on a per food basis, listing both the defect source (pre-harvest infection, processing infestation, processing contamination, etc.) and significance (aesthetic, potential health hazard, mouth/tooth injury, etc.).  For example, the limit of insect contaminants allowed in canned or frozen peaches is specified as: "In 12 1-pound cans or equivalent, one or more larvae and/or larval fragments whose aggregate length exceeds 5 mm."

The Food Defect Action Levels was first published in 1995.  A printed version of the publication may be obtained by written request to the Food and Drug Administration or see External links below.

Health hazards
The insect fragments are classified as an aesthetic problem.  The Food Defect Action Levels states that these contaminants "pose no inherent hazard to health".

Additional examples

See also
Home stored product entomology
Food safety
Insects as food
Criticism of the Food and Drug Administration

References

External links
The Food Defect Action Levels from the U.S. FDA
Levy, E. J. (February 12, 2009). "The Maggots in Your Mushrooms" New York Times.  

Food and Drug Administration
Food safety in the United States
Publications of the United States government